Carolside may refer to the following places: 

 Carolside, Alberta, Canada
 Carolside, Scottish Borders, an estate in Scottish Borders, Scotland